The Aisin AW TF-8# SC series is a 6-speed sealed-for-life automatic transmission designed for use in transverse engine applications produced by Aisin Seiki. It is built in Anjō, Japan,and is also called the TF-80SC (AWF21, AF40-6, AM6, AW6A-EL) and TF-81SC (AF21).. All wheel drive transfer cases can be fitted to the AWTF-80 SC.

The design team set out to create a 6-speed automatic transmission that fits in the same space as a manual gearbox. It measures  in length and weighs . 

A conventional 5-pinion planetary gearset and a compound Ravigneaux gearset were combined in a Lepelletier arrangement, to reduce both the size and weight. 

Gear shifting is managed by a sophisticated computer program that oversees a clutch-to-clutch actuation that allows one clutch engage the instant the clutch from the previous gear disengages. When idling and with the foot brake depressed neutral gear is selected automatically.  This helps to reduce internal temperatures and improve the fuel economy. 

To reduce external wiring as well as to provide a constant environment for TCM operation, the transmission control module (TCM) is located inside the transmission housing. 

Transmission fluid  is labelled as "Maintenance free", however,  in vehicles used primarily for towing, taxi work or in mountainous environments the transmission fluid should be changed every 60,000 km. 

Transmissions made before year 2011 (generation 1) use JWS 3309 standard oil, while transmissions made from year 2011 (generation 2) use JWS 3324 standard oil. 

Saab versions of the transmission use AW-1 Mineral oil.

Specifications

Technical data

Maximum Shift speeds

7,000 rpm(up to 350 Nm)
6500 rpm (350 Nm to 400 Nm)

Torque Converter Diameter

Applications

BMW/MINI

 2014-2020 BMW i8
2015–present BMW 225xe Active Tourer (F45)
2020–present BMW X1 xDrive 25e (F48)
2020–present BMW X2 xDrive 25e (F39)
2014-2017 MINI Cooper (F56/55)
2015-2017 MINI Clubman (F54) with 3 cylinder engines (B37 and B38)
2016-2017 MINI Countryman (F60) with 3 cylinder engines (B37 and B38 FWD)

Fiat Chrysler Automobiles

 Alfa Romeo
 2005–2011 Alfa Romeo 159
 2005–2010 Alfa Romeo Brera
 2006–2010 Alfa Romeo Spider

 Fiat
 2005–2011 Fiat Croma
 2012–2019 Fiat 500

 Lancia
 2008–2014 Lancia Delta

Ford Motor Company

 Ford
 2005–2007 Ford Five Hundred
 2006–2012 Ford Fusion (US)
 2007–2014 Ford Mondeo MkIV 2.3 160 PS Petrol and 2.0 TDCi Diesel
 2006–2014 Ford Galaxy 2.3 118kw / 160PS Petrol (as standard gearbox)

 Lincoln
 2006 Lincoln Zephyr
 2007–2012 Lincoln MKZ

 Mercury
 2005–2010 Mercury Milan
 2005–2007 Mercury Montego

General Motors

 Cadillac
 2005–2010 Cadillac BLS
 2009–2016 Cadillac SRX II

 Chevrolet
 2008–2016 Chevrolet Cruze

 Opel / Vauxhall
 Opel/Vauxhall Astra
 Opel/Vauxhall Vectra
 Opel/Vauxhall Signum
 Opel/Vauxhall Zafira
 2008–2017 Opel/Vauxhall Insignia
 2014–2017 Opel/Vauxhall Meriva

 Saab 
 2006–2014 Saab 9-3 II (FWD & AWD)
 2013–2014 Saab 9-3 III
 2010–2012 Saab 9-5 II

Hyundai

 2006–2014 Hyundai Veracruz

Jaguar

 2007–2009 Jaguar X-type

Land Rover

 2006–2014 Land Rover Freelander 2
 2011–2013 Land Rover Range Rover Evoque

Luxgen

 2013–2015 Luxgen S5 2.0T
 2015-2019 Luxgen S5 ecohyper 1.8T & 2.0T
 2019–Present Luxgen S5 GT(GT225) 1.8T
 2014–2015 Luxgen U6 2.0T
 2015-2018 Luxgen U6 ecohyper 1.8T & 2.0T
 2018–Present Luxgen U6 GT(GT220) 1.8T
 2016–Present Luxgen M7 ecohyper 2.2T
 2016–Present Luxgen U7 ecohyper 2.2T
 2019–Present Luxgen URX 1.8T

Mahindra

 2015–present Mahindra XUV500

Mazda

 2005–2008 Mazda 6 I
 2006–2012 Mazda CX-7
 2006–present Mazda CX-9
 2006–present Mazda MPV III
 2007–2012 Mazda 6 II

PSA Peugeot Citroën

 Citroën
 Citroën C4
 Citroën C5
 Citroën C6
Citroen C8 
 Citroën DS3
 Citroën DS4
 Citroën DS5
 2010–2016 Citroën Jumpy
 Citroën C-Elysée

 Peugeot
 2006–2008 Peugeot 307
 2014-2018 Peugeot 308
 2005–2010 Peugeot 407
 2010–present Peugeot 408
 2011–2018 Peugeot 508
 2005–2010 Peugeot 607
 2008– Peugeot 3008
 2009– Peugeot 5008
 2010–2016 Peugeot Expert

Renault

 2005-2009 Renault Vel Satis
 2006-2010 Renault Espace

Suzuki

 2014–present Suzuki Vitara (FWD & AWD)
 2015–present Suzuki Baleno
 2017–present Suzuki Swift
 2017–present Suzuki SX4 S-Cross

Toyota Group & Lotus (as U6xx & U760e)

Toyota
 2006–2008 Toyota Previa (V6)
 2007–2018 Toyota Camry
 2007–2017 Toyota Aurion (V6)
 2007–2012 Toyota Blade (V6)
 2007–2013 Toyota Mark X Zio (V6)
 2008–2016 Toyota Highlander
 2008–2017 Toyota Alphard (V6)
 2008–2018 Toyota Avalon
 2008–2018 Toyota RAV4
 2009–2017 Toyota Venza
 2011–2016 Toyota Sienna
 2017 Toyota ProAce

 Lexus
 2007–2018 Lexus ES350
 2010–present Lexus RX (350 older models, 200t/300 new models)
 2015–present Lexus NX200t (300 2018–present)

 Lotus
 2012 Lotus Evora (IPS)
 2022–Lotus Emira (V6)

 Scion
 2011–2016 Scion tC

Volkswagen Group
 Audi
 2003–2013 Audi A3
 2015–2018 Audi Q3

 Škoda
 Škoda Octavia
 Škoda Rapid (India, 2019 improvement)

 Volkswagen
 2003–2010 Volkswagen Transporter 
 2007 Volkswagen Jetta
 2009–2017 Volkswagen Tiguan
 2012–present Volkswagen Passat (NMS)
 2019–present Volkswagen Polo (MK5) (India)

Volvo

 2005–2014 Volvo XC90 (FWD & AWD)
 2006–2009 Volvo S60 (FWD & AWD)
 2006–2008 Volvo V70 II (FWD & AWD)
 2006–2008 Volvo XC70 (AWD)
 2007–2016 Volvo S80 II (FWD & AWD)
 2008–2016  Volvo V70 III (FWD & AWD)
 2008–2016  Volvo XC70 II (FWD & AWD)
 2009–2017 Volvo XC60 (FWD & AWD)
 2011–2018 Volvo S60 II (FWD & AWD)
 2016-2017 Volvo S90 (FWD)
 2011–2018 Volvo V60 (FWD & AWD)
 2011–2012 Volvo S40 II (FWD)
 2011–2012 Volvo V50 (FWD)
 2011–2013 Volvo C30 (FWD)
 2011–2013 Volvo C70 II (FWD)
 2012–2014 Volvo V40 II (FWD)

Notes

27. 1.6THP 2.0HDİ

References

(1) https://web.archive.org/web/20110629105820/http://www.mathworks.com/help/toolbox/physmod/drive/a1060120137.html
(2) https://web.archive.org/web/20071225125818/http://www.aisin-aw.co.jp/en/02products/02at/01ff/index.html#ff6speed
(3) http://www.automaticchoice.com/Catalogue/aw_tf80sc.pdf
(4) http://media.gm.com/us/powertrain/en/product_services/2007/Whats%20New/07%20AF40%206%20transmission%20DRAFT%201.doc
(5) http://www.altousa.com/np147.pdf
(6) https://web.archive.org/web/20100215130053/http://www.aw-europe.be/napa/files/drivingInnovation_automaticTransmission_1182180053307_4.pdf
(7) http://media.gm.com/us/powertrain/en/product_services/2007/Spec%20Sheet/Transmissions/2007%20Automatics/07_M36.xls

AWTF-80 SC